The Third Woman (Treća žena) is a 1997 Croatian film directed by Zoran Tadić.

External links
 

1997 films
Croatian-language films
1997 crime drama films
Films set in Zagreb
Croatian crime drama films